3,4-Dihydroxyphenylacetic acid (DOPAC) is a metabolite of the neurotransmitter dopamine.  Dopamine can be metabolized into one of three substances. One such substance is DOPAC. Another is 3-methoxytyramine (3-MT). Both of these substances are degraded to form homovanillic acid (HVA). Both degradations involve the enzymes monoamine oxidase (MAO) and catechol-O-methyl transferase (COMT), albeit in reverse order: MAO catalyzes dopamine to DOPAC, and COMT catalyzes DOPAC to HVA; whereas COMT catalyzes dopamine to 3-MT and MAO catalyzes 3-MT to HVA. The third metabolic end-product of dopamine is norepinephrine (noradrenaline).

DOPAC can be oxidized by hydrogen peroxide, leading to the formation of toxic metabolites which destroy dopamine storage vesicles in the substantia nigra. This may contribute to the failure of levodopa treatment of Parkinson's disease. A MAO-B inhibitor such as selegiline or rasagiline can prevent this from happening.

It can also be found in the bark of Eucalyptus globulus.

This product has been synthesized (52% yield) from 4-hydroxyphenylacetic acid via aerobic biotransformation using whole cell cultures of Arthrobacter protophormiae.

References 

Phenolic human metabolites
Acetic acids
Catechols